Kolkata Port Assembly constituency is a Legislative Assembly constituency of Kolkata district in the Indian state of West Bengal.

Overview
As per orders of the Delimitation Commission, No. 158 Kolkata Port Assembly constituency is composed of the following: Ward Nos. 75, 76, 78, 79, 80, 133, 134 and 135 of Kolkata Municipal Corporation.

Kolkata Port Assembly constituency is part of No. 23 Kolkata Dakshin (Lok Sabha constituency) .

Members of Legislative Assembly

Election results

2021

2016

2011

  
  
  
 

Ram Pyare Ram, contesting as an independent, was a rebel INC candidate.

References

Assembly constituencies of West Bengal
Politics of Kolkata district